Antonio or Tony Rodríguez may refer to:

Sportspeople
Antonio Rodríguez (baseball) (born 1915), Cuban professional baseball player
Antonio Rodríguez (volleyball) (born 1951), Cuban former volleyball player
Antonio Rodríguez Cabo (born 1969), retired Spanish footballer
Antonio Rodríguez Dovale (born 1990), Spanish footballer for Celta de Vigo
Antonio Rodríguez Martínez (born 1979), Spanish footballer for Granada CF
Tony Rodríguez (baseball) (Luis Antonio Rodríguez, born 1970), Puerto Rican Major League Baseball infielder
Antonio Rodríguez Saravia (born 1971), Spanish footballer
Antonio Rodríguez (athlete), Costa Rican distance runner, see Athletics at the 1930 Central American and Caribbean Games
António Rodrigues, Portuguese sprinter
José Antonio Rodríguez (Mexican footballer), Mexican footballer for C.D. Guadalajara

Composers
Antonio Rodríguez Ferrer (1864–1935), Cuban composer and band conductor
Antonio Rodríguez de Hita (1722–1787), Spanish composer

Others
Antonio Rodriguez (entrepreneur), serial entrepreneur and venture capitalist
Antonio Rodriguez (serial killer), the so-called "Kensington Strangler"
Antonio Rodríguez Balinas (1928–2011), brigadier general of United States Army
Antonio Rodríguez Luna (1910–1985), Spanish painter
Antonio Rodríguez Medero (1712–1760), one of the founders of San Antonio, Texas
Antonio Rodríguez Salvador (born 1960), poet, fiction writer, dramatist and essayist
Antonio Rodríguez San Juan (born 1957), governor of Vargas State, Venezuela, since 2001
Tony Rodriguez (criminal) (Anthony or Antonio Rodriguez), crime family mob associate
Antonio Orlando Rodríguez (born 1956), Cuban writer, journalist and critic
Tony R. Rodriguez, American novelist

Fictional characters
Tony Rodriguez (NYPD Blue), a character on the television drama NYPD Blue